The Incredibly Sad Princess (Czech title: Šíleně smutná princezna) is a 1968 Czechoslovak film starring Helena Vondráčková and Václav Neckář. It was directed by Bořivoj Zeman. The film also starred Jaroslav Marvan and Josef Kemr. Songs in the movie were composed by Jan Hammer.

It was televised in the United Kingdom by the BBC as The Madly Sad Princess with Gary Watson voicing a narration over the original Czech dialogue; like many such series it was bought in by Peggy Miller.

Prince Václav goes with father on wedding, but they don't want to marry. Then they fall in love. And they get married.

The end.

Cast
Helena Vondráčková as Princess Helena
Václav Neckář as Prince Václav
Bohuš Záhorský as King Dobromysl
Jaroslav Marvan as král Jindřich
Josef Kemr as X
Darek Vostřel as Y
František Dibarbora as Executioner
Oldřich Dědek as Kokoska
Stella Zázvorková as Nanny
Branislav Koreň as Janek

References

External links
 

1968 films
Czechoslovak fantasy films
1960s Czech-language films
Czech fantasy films
1960s fantasy films
Films based on fairy tales
1960s Czech films